The 2014 NRW Trophy is an international figure skating competition during the 2014–2015 season. An annual event organized by the Skating Union of North Rhine-Westphalia (NRW), it has been sanctioned by the Deutsche Eislauf Union and the International Skating Union since 2007.

Medals are awarded in the disciplines of men's singles, ladies' singles, pair skating, and ice dancing. The competition is held in Dortmund, Germany in two parts. The Ice Dance Trophy, in which ice dancers compete on the senior, junior, and novice levels, was held from 7–9 November 2014. The singles and pairs portion, also with senior, junior, and novice levels, was held from 26–30 November 2014.

Medalists

Men

Ladies

Pairs

Ice dancing

Senior results

Men

Ladies

Pairs

Ice dancing

Junior results

Men

Ladies

Pairs

Ice dancing

Advanced Novice results

Boys

Girls

Pairs

Ice dancing

References

External links
 Official site of the NRW Trophy
 Results: Ice dancing, Singles and pairs

NRW Trophy
2014 in figure skating
NRW Trophy